Phat  may refer to:

People
Huỳnh Tấn Phát (1913–1989), South Vietnamese politician and revolutionary
Lâm Văn Phát (1920–1998), Vietnamese army officer
Phat Wilson (1895–1970), Canadian amateur ice hockey player
Richard Temple-Nugent-Brydges-Chandos-Grenville, 1st Duke of Buckingham and Chandos (1776–1839), nicknamed Phat Duke

Other uses
Phat (card game), a variant of the game All-Fours
Phat (comics), a fictional character in Marvel comics

See also

Fat (disambiguation)
Phat Farm, a designer clothing company